The  is a Japanese order, established on February 11, 1937. The order has one class only, and may be awarded to men and women for contributions to Japan's art, literature, science, technology, or anything related to culture in general; recipients of the order also receive an annuity for life. The order is conferred by the Emperor of Japan in person on Culture Day (November 3) each year. It is considered equivalent to the highest rank (Grand Cordon) of the Order of the Rising Sun, the Order of the Sacred Treasure, and the Order of the Precious Crown. The only orders that Japanese emperors bestow on recipients by their own hands are the Collar of the Supreme Order of the Chrysanthemum, the Grand Cordon of each order, and the Order of Culture.

The badge of the order, which is in gold with white enamel, is in the form of a Tachibana orange blossom; the central disc bears three crescent-shaped jades (magatama). The badge is suspended on a gold and enamel wreath of mandarin orange leaves and fruit, which is in turn suspended on a purple ribbon worn around the neck.

System of recognition

The Order of Culture and Persons of Cultural Merit function together in honoring contributions to the advancement and development of Japanese culture in a variety of fields such as academia, arts and others.

Order of Culture
The Emperor himself presents the honor at the award ceremony, which takes place at the Imperial Palace on the Day of Culture (November 3). Candidates for the Order of Culture are selected from the Persons of Cultural Merit by the Minister of Education, Culture, Sports, Science and Technology, upon hearing views of all the members of the selection committee for the Persons of Cultural Merit. The Minister then recommends the candidates to the Prime Minister so that they can be decided by the Cabinet.

Persons of Cultural Merit

The system for Persons of Cultural Merit was established in 1951 by the Law on Pensions for the Persons of Cultural Merit.  The purpose is to honor persons of cultural merit by providing a special government-sponsored pension. Since 1955, the new honorees have been announced on the Day of Culture, the same day as the award ceremony for the Order of Culture.

Selected recipients

A complete list can be found here.

 Akira Ifukube (1914–2006). A composer of classical music and film scores.
 Ryukichi Inada (1874–1950). A physician, a prominent academic, and bacteriologist researcher.
 Hideo Kobayashi (1902–1983). An author, who established literary criticism as an independent art form in Japan. 
 Akira Kurosawa (1910-1998. A world-famous film director and painter. 
 Hantaro Nagaoka (1865–1950). A physicist and a pioneer of Japanese physics in the early Meiji period.
 Nakamura Kichiemon I (1896–1954). 1st kabuki actor to receive this honor.
 Nakamura Utaemon VI (1917–2001). A famous kabuki actor, known for his oyama roles.<ref>Honor awarded 1979 -- [https://query.nytimes.com/gst/fullpage.html?res=9D00E3D81F3FF937A35757C0A9679C8B63&scp=1&sq=Nakamura+Utaemon+VI%2C+84%2C+International+Star+of+Kabuki. Strom, Stephanie. Nakamura Utaemon VI, 84, International Star of Kabuki"] , New York Times 4 April 2001.</ref>
 Kaii Higashiyama (1908–1999). A famous artist and writer, renowned for his Nihonga style paintings. 
 Kinjiro Okabe (1896–1984). An electrical engineering researcher and professor who developed the split-anode magnetron.
 Jirō Osaragi (1897–1973). A popular writer in Shōwa period.
 Junjiro Takakusu (1866–1945). An academic, an advocate for expanding higher education opportunities, and an internationally known Buddhist scholar.
 Kenjiro Takayanagi (1899–1990). A pioneer in the development of television.
 Morohashi Tetsuji (1883–1982). An important figure in the world of Japanese studies and Sinology.
 Susumu Tonegawa (born 1939). A scientist who won the Nobel Prize for Physiology or Medicine in 1987.
 Eiji Yoshikawa (1892–1962). A historical novelist.
 Yasunari Kawabata (1899–1972). A novelist who won the Nobel Prize for Literature in 1968.

1990s

1992
 Masaru Ibuka (1908–1997). Co-founder, President and Chairman of Sony Corporation.

1994
 Takashi Asahina (1908–2001).  Orchestral conductor.
 Tadao Umesao (1920–2010). Ethnologist.
 Hideo Shima (1901–1998). Railway engineer.

1995
 Shigemitsu Dandō (1913–2012). Criminologist.
 Shūsaku Endō (1923–1996). Writer.

1996
 Hanae Mori (born 1926).  Fashion designer.
 Rizō Takeuchi (1907–1997). Historian of Japan.

1997
 Masatoshi Koshiba (1926–2020).  Nobel Prize-winning physicist.
 Hirofumi Uzawa (1928–2014). Economist.

1998
 Ikuo Hirayama (1930–2009). Nihonga artist.
 Tadamitsu Kishimoto (born 1939).  Immunologist.

1999
 Hiroyuki Agawa (1920–2015). Writer.
Fuku Akino (1908–2001). Nihonga artist.
 Takeshi Umehara (born 1925).  Scholar of Japanese cultural studies.

2000s

2000
 Ryōji Noyori. Nobel Prize-winning chemist.
 Hideki Shirakawa. Nobel Prize-winning chemist.
 Isuzu Yamada. Actress.

2001
 Chie Nakane. Social anthropologist.
 Toshio Yodoi (1911–2005).  Sculptor.

2002
 Kyōhei Fujita (1921–2004).  Glass artist.
 Kaneto Shindō. Film director.
 Kōichi Tanaka. Nobel Prize-winning scientist.

2003
 Kazuhiko Nishijima (1926–2009). Physicist.
 Sadako Ogata. Political scientist and diplomat.
 Makoto Ōoka. Poet and literary critic.

2004
 Yōji Totsuka (1942–2008). Physicist.
 Nakamura Jakuemon, Kabuki actor.
 Toan Kobayashi, Seal carver.
 Shizuka Shirakawa, Scholar of Chinese-language literature.
 Horin Fukuoji, Nihonga painter.

2005
 Mitsuko Mori. Actress.
 Makoto Saitō (1921–2008). Political scientist, specializing in American diplomatic and political history.
 Ryuzan Aoki, Ceramic artist.
 Toshio Sawada, Civil engineer.
 Shigeaki Hinohara, Doctor.

2006
 Yoshiaki Arata. A pioneer of nuclear fusion research.
 Jakuchō Setouchi. Writer/Buddhist nun.
 Hidekazu Yoshida. Music critic.
 Chusaku Oyama, Nihonga painter.
 Miyohei Shinohara, Economist.

2007
 Akira Mikazuki. Former justice minister and professor emeritus.
 Shinya Nakamura. Sculptor.
 Kōji Nakanishi. Organic chemist.
 Tokindo Okada, Developmental biologist.
 Shigeyama Sensaku, Kyogen performer.

2008
 Hironoshin Furuhashi (1928–2009).  Sportsman and sports bureaucrat.
 Kiyoshi Itō. A mathematician whose work is now called Itō calculus.
 Donald Keene. A Japanologist, scholar, teacher, writer, translator and interpreter of Japanese literature and culture.
 Makoto Kobayashi. A physicist who was awarded the 2008 Nobel Prize in Physics.
 Toshihide Masukawa. A theoretical physicist who was awarded the 2008 Nobel Prize in Physics.
 Seiji Ozawa. A conductor, particularly noted for his interpretations of large-scale late Romantic works.
 Osamu Shimomura. An organic chemist and marine biologist who was awarded the 2008 Nobel Prize in Chemistry.
 Seiko Tanabe. Author.

2009
 Sumio Iijima. Physicist.
 Tōjūrō Sakata IV. Kabuki actor.
 Katsura Beicho, Rakugo performer.
 Akira Hayami, Economist, Historian.
 Yorio Hinuma, Virologist.

2010s

2010
 Tadao Ando. Architect.
 Akito Arima. Nuclear physicist.
 Issei Miyake. Fashion designer.
 Eiichi Negishi. Chemistry Nobel Prize laureate.
 Yukio Ninagawa. Stage director.
 Akira Suzuki. Chemistry Nobel Prize laureate.
 Haruko Wakita. Medieval historian.

2011
 Isamu Akasaki, Engineer.
 Ohi Chozaemon, potter.
 Saiichi Maruya, Author.
 Taichiro Mitani, Political and history scholar.
 Mitsuhiro Yanagida, Molecular biologist.

2012
 Shigeru Oda, Jurist, a judge on the International Court of Justice from 1976 to 2003.
 Yoji Yamada, Film Director.
 Shinya Yamanaka, Physiology Nobel Prize laureate, biologist.
 Shuji Takashina, art critic.
 Toshio Matsuo, nihonga painter.
 Yashuyuki Yamada, agronomist.

2013
 Ken Takakura, noted Japanese actor.
 Susumu Nakanishi, noted scholar of Japanese literature.
 Shunichi Iwasaki, noted scholar of electrical engineering.
 Seikaku Takagi, noted Japanese calligrapher.
 Tasuku Honjo, noted immunologist

2014
 Hiroshi Amano, Physics Nobel Prize laureate in 2014.
 Shuji Nakamura, Physics Nobel Prize laureate in 2014.
 Takemoto Sumitayu, narrator of Japanese bunraku, also known as a “ningyo joruri” (puppet theater).
 Taeko Kōno, writer and critic and is considered one of the most important contemporary writers of modern Japanese literature.
 Toyoki Kunitake, researcher in molecular architecture.
 Takashi Negishi, economist.
 Gyoji Nomiyama, Western-style painter.

2020s

2021
 Syukuro Manabe. Nobel Prize winning climatologist.
 Shigeo Nagashima. noted former Japanese baseball player.
 Onoe Kikugoro VII. Kabuki actor.
 Tsuneko Okazaki. Molecular biology researcher.
 Hirohiko Okano. Japanese tanka poet.
 Junzo Kawada. Anthropologist.
 Koji Kinutani. Painter.
 Shigefumi Mori. Mathematician.
 Asami Maki. Ballet dancer.

Known to have declined the honor
Kenzaburō Ōe, 1994 Nobel laureate and critic of the Japanese Imperial system.
Haruko Sugimura, actress.

See also
Order of Merit (UK)
Pour le Mérite (Germany; recognised by the state, though not a state order)
Ordre des Palmes Académiques (France)
Order of Saint Catherine the Great Martyr (Russia)
Order of Honour (Russia) 
Civil Order of Alfonso X, the Wise (Spain)
Italian Order of Merit for Culture and Art
Order of Cultural Merit (Korea)
Order of the Direkgunabhorn (Thailand)
Austrian Decoration for Science and Art

Notes

References
 Peterson, James W., Barry C. Weaver and Michael A. Quigley. (2001). Orders and Medals of Japan and Associated States.'' San Ramon, California: Orders and Medals Society of America.

External links
 Japan, Cabinet Office: Decorations and Medals
 Decoration Bureau: Order of Culture
 Japan Mint: Production Process

Awards established in 1937
Orders, decorations, and medals of Japan